Fabbri's Once Upon a Time series was based on the popular [[Story Teller (Marshall Cavendish)|Story Teller]] series. It also had a slogan which was "The world of Traditional Fairy Tales & Fables." Like its predecessor, it was a collection of storybooks that came with cassette tapes. Story Teller regulars like Carole Boyd and Nigel Lambert lent their vocal talents to this collection. 
Actor John Shrapnel introduced each one and told one of the stories himself.

The intro of each cassette always started with this:"Long Ago and Far Away in Enchanted Lands across the seas lived Kings and Queens, Princes and Princesses, Good Fairies and Wicked Witches, Ferocious Giants and Gentle Dwarfs. Their Adventures and Stories have been told for Hundreds of Years. Open the pages and listen to the words and you too can join the magical world of Once Upon a Time."The main title theme was "Christmas Box" by Paddy Kingsland

 Issues 

Each issue of Once Upon a Time'' was devoted to one story only with mostly Fairy Tales by The Brothers Grimm and Hans Christian Andersen. The canary yellow cassettes came without a small plastic protective case but a total of five large red plastic cases were given away free with Issues 1, 12, 24, 36 and 48. Each were made to hold twelve of every issue and cassette. Some also came with a giant poster showing 24 Issues as a checklist to those who were collecting each one. 60 issues were produced:

In other languages 
French "Il était une fois"
German "Die Märchen dieser Welt"

References

External links 
 Partworks.co.uk: Once Upon a Time

Children's short story collections
Audiobooks by title or series
Partworks
Series of children's books